Four ships of the United States Navy have borne the name USS Ingraham, named in honor of Captain Duncan Ingraham

United States Navy ship names